AFOL may refer to:

 Africa Online, an African Internet service provider
 Adult Fan of Lego

See also
 Afful